Namjilyn Bayarsaikhan (born August 10, 1965) is a retired Mongolian boxer. At the 1992 Summer Olympics, he won the bronze medal in the men's Lightweight category. He was born in Zavkhan Province.

Olympic results 
1st round bye
Defeated Mauricio Avila (Guatemala) 15–0
Defeated Rashid Matumla (Tanzania) 9–6
Lost to Marco Rudolph (Germany) walk-over

References

External links
 
profile
Profile

1965 births
Living people
People from Zavkhan Province
Olympic boxers of Mongolia
Boxers at the 1992 Summer Olympics
Olympic bronze medalists for Mongolia
Olympic medalists in boxing
Medalists at the 1992 Summer Olympics
Mongolian male boxers
Lightweight boxers
21st-century Mongolian people
20th-century Mongolian people